Nazim also spelled Nadhem, Nadhim, Nadhum or Nazem) is an Arabic-based surname. As the pronunciation of the Arabic letter Ẓāʾ is often closer to a strong "d" sound, therefore the name's pronunciation differs based on the spoken varieties of Arabic and consequently in its transcription.

Nazim as a surname or middle name may refer to:

Surname

Nazem
Farzad Nazem, Iranian businessman

Nazim
Mohammad Nazim, Indian model and television actor
Nazriya Nazim (born 1994), Indian film actress and producer

Nadhim
Ali Nadhim (born 1981), Iraqi Greco-Roman wrestler

Middle name
Mirza Nazim Shah (1820–1902), son of Mughal emperor Akbar II and his consort Gumani Khanum
Mustafa Nadhim Jari (Arabic: مصطفى ناظم جاري, born 23 September 1993 in Al-Diwaniyah, Iraq) is an Iraqi footballer player 
Shahriar Nazim Joy, Bangladeshi actor, writer, and director

See also
Nazim (given name)
Nazim (disambiguation)